Hugh V (c. 1055/1062 – 1131) was the count of Maine from 1069 until c. 1093.

Life 
He was the son of Margrave Albert Azzo II of Milan and Gersendis, a sister of Count Hugh IV of Maine. In 1070, the citizens of Le Mans and some of the Manceaux barons revolted against Norman control. After securing the southern border of Normandy and expelling the Normans, they invited young Hugh V to rule them as count of Maine. They soon realized, however, he was incapable of ruling Maine and began to detest him. Orderic Vitalis said of him "he was, indeed, an imbecile, a coward, and an idler, and totally unfit to hold the reins of government in so high a station." After a short time holding the countship, his cousin Elias convinced Hugh to sell him the county, which he did.

In 1077 Hugh married Gersent, the daughter of Robert Guiscard, but after discovering he could not manage her either he repudiated her, was promptly excommunicated by Pope Urban II and died childless.

References

Sources

11th-century births
12th-century deaths
House of Este
Counts of Maine
11th-century French people
12th-century French people